Kamameshi (釜飯) literally translates to "kettle rice" and is a traditional Japanese rice dish cooked in an iron pot called a kama. Kamameshi originally referred to rice that was eaten communally from the kama. Coworkers or family members either ate directly from the kama pot or by transferring the rice to individual bowls. The term emerged in the late Meiji period, and is associated with the communal eating of rice in the aftermath of the 1923 Great Kantō earthquake. Later, similar to takikomi gohan, kamameshi came to refer to a type of Japanese pilaf cooked with various types of meat, seafood, and vegetables, and flavored with soy sauce, sake, or mirin. By cooking the rice and various ingredients in an iron pot, the rice gets slightly burned at the bottom which adds a desirable flavor to the rice. Kama designed specifically to prepare kamameshi appeared on the market as the dish became popular across Japan, and the prepared kamameshi is placed directly on the table in its pot for the meal. A small-scale replica of the kama is used to create an individual serving of kamameshi, and the dish is now a popular ekiben.

Many East Asian cuisines also prepare rice in a similar way using a clay pot or stone bowl. In China it is known as guō fàn (鍋飯) or, in Cantonese bo zai fan (煲仔飯), and in Korea dolsot bibimbap (돌솥 비빔밥)

References

Chinese rice dishes
Japanese rice dishes
Communal eating